Mieczysław Balcer (12 June 1906 – 13 March 1995) was a Polish footballer. He played in ten matches for the Poland national football team from 1924 to 1934, scoring eight goals.

References

External links
 

1906 births
1995 deaths
Polish footballers
Poland international footballers
Footballers from Kraków
Association football forwards
MKS Cracovia (football) players
Wisła Kraków players
Warta Poznań players